Khumoyun Agzamdzhanovich Sultanov (born 27 October 1998) is an Uzbek tennis player.

Sultanov has a career high ATP singles ranking of 299 achieved on 17 February 2020. He also has a career high ATP doubles ranking of 451 achieved on 28 October 2019.

Sultanov represents Uzbekistan at the Davis Cup, where he has a W/L record of 1–1.

Challenger and Futures/World Tennis Tour finals

Singles: 5 (3-2)

Doubles 14 (8–6)

Davis Cup

Participations: (1–1)

   indicates the outcome of the Davis Cup match followed by the score, date, place of event, the zonal classification and its phase, and the court surface.

Another finals

Universiade

Singles 1 (1 runner-up)

Doubles 1 (1 victory)

External links

1998 births
Living people
Uzbekistani male tennis players
Universiade medalists in tennis
Universiade gold medalists for Uzbekistan
Universiade silver medalists for Uzbekistan
Medalists at the 2019 Summer Universiade
21st-century Uzbekistani people